Brigadier Mirza Hamid Hussain (4 July 1914 – 12 August 1987) was a Pakistan army officer, intelligence officer and diplomat.

Early life
Hussain was born in 1914 at Delhi. He was educated at Aligarh Muslim University, Aligarh and the 'Prince of Wales' Royal Military College RIMC, Dehra Dun and the Indian Military Academy.

Indian Army career
He was commissioned from the Indian Military Academy on 1 February 1935 and was attached to a British Army regiment, 1st battalion The King's Shropshire Light Infantry. He joined the 5th battalion, 11th Sikh Regiment 16 March 1936. His initial date of commission was antedated to 4 February 1934 and he was promoted Lieutenant 4 May 1936. He saw active service on the Frontier Waziristan operations.

He was the first and senior most Muslim Commissioned Officer to join the Indian Army Ordnance Corps in 1940. He served in Iraq and Iran in various senior appointments such as DADOD 10th Army and Chief Ordnance Officer. He graduated from the Staff College, Quetta, in 1945 and commanded various Ordnance Depots in India. He was then appointed ADOS in G.H.Q. India where he was in charge of Operation and training for the Ordnance Service.

Pakistan Army career
On the independence of Pakistan in 1947, he opted for Pakistan Army and came to Pakistan as Deputy Director Ordnance Service G.H.Q. Rawalpindi. Later he was appointed Director of Weapon and Equipment in the General Staff Branch G.H.Q. and subsequently took over as Director of Staff Duties. On completion of tenure, he was appointed Director of Inter-Services Intelligence, Karachi.

Senior appointments
He was selected for Foreign Service in 1951 and was appointed Deputy Secretary in the Ministry of Foreign affairs in charge of the Middle East Division. Later, he became Chief of Protocol. In 1952 he was selected for the appointment of Counselor, Pakistan High Commission, London. He has been counselor in Iraq, Iran and Turkey. He has been charge d'affairs as Joint secretary, Chief of Protocol. He was honored with the 'Order of Monrovia' and 'Membership of the Civil Merit' from Spain.

He was a direct descendant of Nawab Qasim Khan who came to India from Yarkand. He died in 1987 at the age of 73 in Lahore.

Further reading
 The Battle Within, by Brigadier Mirza Hamid Hussain, Pakistan Army 33. 1970.  -.(ebook)

References

Genealogy of the Nawabs of Loharu Queensland University

1914 births
1987 deaths
Aligarh Muslim University alumni
Rashtriya Indian Military College alumni
Indian Army personnel of World War II
Pakistan Army officers
High Commissioners of Pakistan to Sri Lanka
British Indian Army officers